This is a list of French television related events from 1956.

Events
24 May - France enters the Eurovision Song Contest for the first time with "Le temps perdu", performed by Mathé Altéry and "Il est là", performed by Dany Dauberson.

Debuts
11 January - La Piste aux étoiles (1956-1978)

Television shows

1940s
Le Jour du Seigneur (1949–present)

1950s
Le Club du jeudi (1950-1961)
Magazine féminin (1952-1970)
Lectures pour tous (1953-1968)
La Boîte à sel (1955-1960)
Présence protestante (1957-)

Ending this year

Face à l'opinion

Births

Deaths

See also
1956 in France
List of French films of 1956